Bonifacio: Ang Unang Pangulo is a 2014 Philippine historical action drama film centering on the life of Katipunan revolutionary Andres Bonifacio. It was an official entry to the 40th Metro Manila Film Festival.

Plot
The film begins with the execution of GOMBURZA in the aftermath of the 1872 Cavite Mutiny. On July 3, 1892, Dr. Jose Rizal (Jericho Rosales) founds La Liga Filipina, a peaceful reform movement that aims to unite all Filipinos and give them one voice. One of its members is Andres Bonifacio (Robin Padilla), who is currently supporting his siblings, as both their parents died due to illness. Rizal is later arrested after the Spanish authorities uncover the organization. Bonifacio then decides to form the Katipunan to lead a revolution against the Spanish colonizers.

With the help of his friend Teodoro Plata, he meets Gregoria de Jesús (Vina Morales), who is also known as Bantug. Bonifacio visits the church, meeting Bantug again. She knows that he joined a group of Masons and is not religious. Bonifacio denies the accusations, saying that those are just inventions of the friars. Later that day, while walking on the street, they encounter a friend of Oriang (Pepe Herrera), begging a friar to give his salary in the polo. However, the friar refuses and instead makes derogatory remarks towards the man. Later, he is shot by one of the Spanish soldiers.

Bonifacio and Oriang's relationship develops and they finally marry after Bantug's parents gave their approval. Then while recruiting additional katipuneros, Bonifacio finds out that Teodoro and Nonay Bonifacio are lovers. The following day, a gobernadorcillo named Emilio Aguinaldo is inducted to the Katipunan.

The Katipunan starts publishing the newspaper “Ang Kalayaan” through the printing press of Diario de Manila. They distribute the papers to their fellow countrymen to further expand the organization. However, word of these subversive activities eventually reaches the Spanish authorities. After hearing this, the Spanish raid the Katipunan's Binondo press office wherein they discover "Ang Kalayaan". Because of this discovery, they begin to grow wary of anti-government activities.

Afterwards, a man who is one of the people that published the paper is tortured. Upon seeing the man's dead body, Bonifacio calls all the Katipuneros to gather in Tandang Sora's home. Tandang Sora gives a sword to Bonifacio for him to use during their fights against the Spaniards. Later on, Bonifacio declares the start of the revolution on August 29, 1896. All men tear their cedulas and they scream, "Mabuhay ang Katipunan! Mabuhay ang rebolusyon! Mabuhay ang Supremo!"

On the day of the revolution, they cross a river and secretly pull a foot of one of the Spanish soldiers while the other one is shot by Bonifacio. In the entrance of one of the officials' houses, Bonifacio throws a torch that is lit up in the trolley loaded with canisters and shoots it, letting them get inside the gate. A battle then ensues between the revolutionaries and the Spanish garrison. Eventually, Bonifacio is able to kill the Gobernador Heneral by stabbing. After the battle, the Katipuneros replace the flag of Spain with the KKK flag.

Aguinaldo's comrades are concerned that the revolution might die under Bonifacio's leadership. They advise Aguinaldo to urge Bonifacio to come to Cavite to reunify the factions of the Magdiwang and Magdalo and hold an election for it. Aguinaldo is elected as the president, while Bonifacio is only elected as the interior minister. A Magdalo member, Daniel Tirona, objects to his election and insults him, angering Bonifacio who then challenges Tirona to a duel. Feeling discriminated, Bonifacio, as Supremo of the Katipunan, voids the election results. The newly formed, Aguinaldo-led revolutionary group is concerned about the unity of Katipunan after failing to persuade Bonifacio to join them. Aguinaldo then orders the capture of Bonifacio, during which Bonifacio is stabbed at the neck and suffers a gunshot wound in his arm. His brother Ciriaco is shot dead, while his other brother Procopio is beaten, and his wife Oriang possibly raped by Col. Agapito Bonzón. Suffering from his untreated wounds, Bonifacio tells his wife Oriang of his dream of finally achieving his wish of the country's independence against Spain. Later on, Andres Bonifacio and Procopio Bonifacio are sentenced to death.

At the end of the film, Bonifacio is shown holding his personal flag aloft while leading his troops in a charge against Spanish forces. His personal flag slowly turns into the present Philippine Flag. In the post-credits scene, Antonio Luna makes a cameo appearance (This is an actual part as a preparation for the film entitled Heneral Luna).

Cast

Main cast

Robin Padilla as Andres Bonifacio
Vina Morales as Oriang
Eddie Garcia as Museum of Philippine Political History curator
Daniel Padilla as Joaquin
Jasmine Curtis-Smith as Andrea
RJ Padilla as Gary

Supporting cast 
Jericho Rosales as José Rizal
Isabel Oli as Espiridiona "Nonay" Bonifacio
Joem Bascon as Emilio Jacinto
Rommel Padilla as Padre Mariano Gomez
Isko Moreno as Padre José Burgos
Dennis Marasigan as Padre Jacinto Zamora
E.A. Rocha as El Heneral
Fernando Ortigas as Glaring Friar
Ping Medina as Ladislao Diwa
Richard Quan as Teodoro Plata
Junjun Quintana as Procopio Bonifacio
Cholo Barretto as Ciriaco Bonifacio
Miguel Faustmann as Padre Gil
Lou Veloso as Tatang
Bon Vibar as Governor Blanco
Jun Nayra as Emilio Aguinaldo
Crispin Pineda as Moises
Pepe Herrera as Filipino Worker
Mike Gayoso as Lazaro Macapagal
Mon Confiado as Col. Agapito Bonzón
Erlinda Villalobos as Tandang Sora
Bong Cabrera as Teodoro Patiño

Additional cast 
Joshua Lichtenberg as young Andres Bonifacio
Hector Zaghi as young Padre Gil
Dominic Roque as Bully 1
Patrick Sugui as Bully 2
Ivan Pierre as Bully 3
Jioca Javier as Maxima Bonifacio
David Agonia as Troadio Bonifacio
Richard Manabat as Deodato Arellano
Ernie dela Cruz as Valentin Diaz
Francisco Godoy as Jose Dizon
Ces Aldaba as Nicolás de Jesús
Jeanne Vicars as Baltazara Alvarez Francisco
Ruth Alferez as Josefa Rizal
Maki Calilung as Trinidad Rizal
Rina Navarro as Marina Dizon
Rick Sanchez as Pio Valenzuela
Myla Angelica Nagal Ajero as Honoria Patiño
Juliana Ysla as Sor Teresa
Julius Java as Spanish Lieutenant 1
Henry Strzalkowski as Spanish Lieutenant 2
Jan Urbano as Baldomero Aguinaldo
Lawrence Roxas as Daniel Tirona
Apollo Abraham as Mariano Alvarez
Jack Love Falcis as Artemio Ricarte
Alireza Libre as Ariston Villanueva
Arkin Villanueva as Edilberto Evangelista
Alex Laquindanum as Jose Del rosario
Jet Edu as Diego Mojica
Marol Eugenio as Feliz Topacio

Production
Philippians Productions is the studio responsible for the conception of Bonifacio. Enzo Williams, a Los Angeles City College graduate was the director for the film. Williams was aided by cinematographer Carlo Mendoza, production designer Roy Lachica, musical scorer Von de Guzman, and stunt director Sonny Sison who has worked for Hollywood. Producers are Rina Navarro and Eduardo Rocha.

According to Williams, he did six months of research before working on the film.
The film was entirely shot using an Arri Alexa camera with anamorphic lenses and a complete Arri Raw post-production workflow, and was edited using processes which are also used in major Hollywood movies such as Gravity and Iron Man 3. Bonifacio is the first film in the Philippines to device the technology.

Robin Padilla, who usually does his own fight choreography entrusted himself to the production staff's hired choreographer.

Williams supervised the work of the location managers to locate a suitable location for a scene during the shooting of the film. The production staff resorts to a building sets if a suitable location for a certain scene satisfying Williams' standards can not be found. The fort of El Polvorin, the Aguinaldo Shrine and the house of the La Liga Filipina meetings were among those recreated as sets. Part of the film was shot in Pagsanjan where the production staff erected a big battleground set for a scene. Shootings also took place at the heritage resort of Las Casas Filipinas de Acuzar in Bagac, Bataan.
The production expenses of the film exceeded the original budget. The production budget for the film is ₱100 million excluding expenses for the promotion of the film.

Regarding on the casting of the Gregoria de Jesus, Bonifacio's wife also known as Oriang, in the film, Williams asked star actor Robin Padilla, who portrayed Bonifacio for his opinion and suggest Vina Morales to portray Oriang. Iza Calzado was originally the one to portray the role of Oriang, but did not due to scheduling conflicts.

The film was initially planned to be released under the title Bonifacio, Gusto Mo Ba Siyang Makilala? (English: Bonifacio, Do you Want to Know Him?).

Release
The film opened on December 25, 2014, but the film did not do well at the box office. Robin Padilla said that the movie only earned ₱10 million against its 100 million budget. The film ended its theatrical run at the 7th place.

International release
The “international version” includes English subtitles, fresh footage and additional content featuring lead star Robin Padilla, who plays Bonifacio first shown in Barcelona, Spain earlier 2015, had its US premiere in New York City, screenings in Los Angeles in December the same year.

Accolades
Bonifacio: Ang Unang Pangulo won the most awards at the 40th Metro Manila Film Festival among the eight entries for the mainstream category of the film festival, receiving nine awards including Best Picture. The awarding ceremony was held at the PICC Plenary Hall on December 27, 2014.

References

External links

2014 films
Biographical action films
Cultural depictions of Andrés Bonifacio
Cultural depictions of Emilio Aguinaldo
Cultural depictions of Governors-General of the Philippines
Cultural depictions of José Rizal
Films set in the 1890s
Films set in the Philippines
Films shot in Bataan
Films shot in Laguna (province)
Historical action films
Historical revisionism
Philippine biographical films
Philippine epic films
Philippine historical films